The Apco Simba is an Israeli single-place, paraglider that was designed and produced by Apco Aviation of Caesarea. It is now out of production.

Design and development
The Simba was designed as a competition glider for the Serial Class and the Open Class, replacing the Apco Bagheera in that role.

The Simba is made from 46gr/m2 "Zero Porosity" ripstop nylon. The Simba was produced in regular and competition models, with competition version differing only in the type of line used. The competition model employs unsheathed Aramid lines of identical lengths and layout to the sheathed lines of the regular model.

The design progressed through two generations of models, the Simba and the Simba II. The Simba II was introduced in 2002 as an update of the original Simba design. It incorporates an improved speed system, along with a new tip A-line layout. This gives better glide and stability at top speed, as well as an increase in the top speed. The improved tip line layout gives easier "Big Ear" deployment.

The models are each named for their relative size.

Variants
Simba XS Competition
Extra small-sized model for lighter pilots. The glider model is AFNOR Performance certified.
Simba S
Small-sized model for light-weight pilots. The glider model is AFNOR Performance certified.
Simba II XS
Extra small-sized model for lighter pilots. The glider model is AFNOR Performance certified.
Simba II S
Small-sized model for light-weight pilots. The glider model is AFNOR Performance and DHV 2 certified.
Simba II M
Mid-sized model for medium-weight pilots. The glider model is AFNOR Performance and DHV 2 certified.
Simba II L
Large-sized model for heavier pilots. The glider model is AFNOR Performance and DHV 2 certified.

Specifications (Simba XS Competition)

References

External links

Simba
Paragliders